Lot and his Daughters, with Sodom and Gomorrah Burning is a miniature in pen and watercolour from a very late  illuminated manuscript bible.

The page size is 19 x 15 centimeters. It is in the collection of the Museum of the Romanian Peasant.

The scene uses the traditional iconography for the biblical scene of Lot and his daughters, leaving the Cities of the Plain, led by an angel. On the right behind them is Lot's wife, who was turned into a pillar of salt for looking back to the city.

See also 
 Sodom and Gomorrah

References 

Manuscripts
1842 works
Paintings of Lot (biblical person)